Edward Charles "Chuck" Muelhaupt (December 11, 1935 – March 31, 2012) was a professional American football player who played offensive lineman for three seasons for the Buffalo Bills.

References

1935 births
2012 deaths
American football offensive linemen
Buffalo Bills players
Iowa State Cyclones football players
Players of American football from Canton, Ohio